Love at Large is a 1990 American romance and mystery film directed by Alan Rudolph and starring Tom Berenger, Elizabeth Perkins and Anne Archer.

Plot
Set in a present that feels more like the past, Harry Dobbs is a private detective surrounded by mysterious and dangerous dames. Among them is his angry girlfriend, Doris, and the suspicious women he encounters on his latest case.

In a nightclub, the sultry Miss Dolan hires the private eye to follow her lover, Rick, who might be trying to kill her. The trail takes Harry to women like Mrs. King and Mrs. McGraw, who apparently are wed to the same man.

A female investigator named Stella Wynkowski turns up. Harry teams up with her, never entirely certain whether she is friend or foe.  But the trouble really starts when Harry realizes that he is following the wrong guy and then finds out that he is being followed himself.

Cast
 Tom Berenger as Harry Dobbs
 Elizabeth Perkins as Stella Wynkowski
 Anne Archer as Miss Dolan
 Kate Capshaw as Mrs. Ellen McGraw
 Annette O'Toole as Mrs. King
 Ted Levine as Frederick King / James McGraw
 Ann Magnuson as Doris
 Kevin J. O'Connor as Art the Farmhand
 Ruby Dee as Corrine Dart
 Barry Miller as Marty
 Neil Young as Rick
 Meegan Lee Ochs as Bellhop
 Gailard Sartain as Taxi Driver
 Robert Gould as Tavern Bartender
 Dirk Blocker as Hiram Culver, Used-Car Salesman

Production
Filming took place in Portland, Oregon.

References

External links

1990 films
1990s romance films
1990s English-language films
American mystery films
Films directed by Alan Rudolph
Orion Pictures films
Films scored by Mark Isham
Films shot in Portland, Oregon
1990s American films